Buckingham Rural District was a rural district in the administrative county of Buckinghamshire, England from 1894 to 1974, covering an area in the north-west of the county. It was named after but did not include the borough of Buckingham.

History
The district had its origins in the Buckingham Poor Law Union, which had been created in 1835, covering Buckingham itself and several surrounding parishes. In 1872 sanitary districts were established, giving public health and local government responsibilities for rural areas to the existing boards of guardians of poor law unions. The Buckingham Rural Sanitary District therefore covered the area of the poor law union except for Buckingham itself, which was a municipal borough and so formed its own urban sanitary authority. The Buckingham Rural Sanitary District was administered from Buckingham Union Workhouse which had been built in 1838 at 19 Stratford Road, Buckingham.

Under the Local Government Act 1894, rural sanitary districts became rural districts from 28 December 1894. The act also directed that districts should not straddle county boundaries. Whilst the Buckingham Rural Sanitary District was entirely in Buckinghamshire, the neighbouring Brackley Rural Sanitary District straddled Northamptonshire, Oxfordshire, and Buckinghamshire. It was therefore decided before the act came into force that the three Buckinghamshire parishes from the Brackley Rural Sanitary District (Biddlesden, Turweston, and Westbury), would be added to the Buckingham Rural District. The Buckingham Rural District Council held its first meeting on 29 December 1894 at the workhouse in Buckingham. William Weston of Adstock was appointed the first chairman of the council.

Civil parishes
Buckingham Rural District comprised the following civil parishes:

 Addington, Adstock, Akeley
 Barton Hartshorn, Beachampton, Biddlesden
 Charndon, Chetwode
 Edgcott
 Foscott
 Hillesden
 Leckhampstead, Lillingstone Dayrell, Lillingstone Lovell, Luffield Abbey
 Maids Moreton, Marsh Gibbon, Middle Claydon
 Padbury, Poundon, Preston Bissett
 Radclive-cum-Chackmore
 Shalstone, Steeple Claydon, Stowe
 Thornborough, Thornton, Tingewick, Turweston, Twyford
 Water Stratford, Westbury

Premises
Until the 1920s the council met at the Buckingham Union Workhouse at 19 Stratford Road, Buckingham, with administrative functions being carried out at various offices in Buckingham. In 1926 the council bought a large early nineteenth century house called Chandos House on School Lane in Buckingham for £400, and converted it to become their offices and meeting place. The council remained based at Chandos House until its abolition in 1974.

Abolition
Buckingham Rural District was abolished under the Local Government Act 1972. The area became part of the Aylesbury Vale district on 1 April 1974.

References

Districts of England created by the Local Government Act 1894
Districts of England abolished by the Local Government Act 1972
History of Buckinghamshire
Local government in Buckinghamshire
Rural districts of England